Crockett House is a historic home located at Pocomoke City, Worcester County, Maryland, United States. The house is a two-story center passage plan frame dwelling, constructed about 1850, that reflects the influence of the Greek Revival style.  Attached is a stepped "telescope" service wing.

Crockett House was listed on the National Register of Historic Places in 1996.

References

External links
, including 1973 photo, at Maryland Historical Trust

Houses in Worcester County, Maryland
Houses on the National Register of Historic Places in Maryland
Greek Revival houses in Maryland
Houses completed in 1850
National Register of Historic Places in Worcester County, Maryland